Device Manager is a component of the Microsoft Windows operating system. It allows users to view and control the hardware attached to the computer. When a piece of hardware is not working, the offending hardware is highlighted for the user to deal with. The list of hardware can be sorted by various criteria.

For each device, users can:
Supply device drivers in accordance with the Windows Driver Model
Enable or disable devices
Tell Windows to ignore malfunctioning devices
View other technical properties

Device Manager was introduced with Windows 95 and later added to Windows 2000. On Windows 9x, Device Manager is part of the System applet in Control Panel. On Windows 2000 and all other Windows NT-based versions of Windows, it is a snap-in for Microsoft Management Console.

Types of icons

Disabled device
A disabled device has either been manually disabled by a user or by some way of error. In Windows 95 through XP, this is denoted by a red X. In Windows Vista and Windows 7, this was replaced by a grey downward pointing arrow in the lower right-hand corner of the device's icon.

Hardware not working properly
There are many reasons why hardware may not work properly. If Windows recognizes a problem with a device, it is denoted by a black exclamation point (!) on a yellow triangle in the lower right-hand corner of the device's icon.

Hardware not recognized
Hardware may not be recognized if it is not installed properly or not compatible with the system. This is denoted by a yellow question mark in place of the device's icon.

Device manually selected
A blue "i" on a white field in the lower right-hand corner of a Device's icon indicates that the Use automatic settings feature is not selected for the device and that the resource was manually selected. Note that this does not indicate a problem or disabled state.

Error codes
Device Manager error codes are numerical codes, each accompanied by an error message, which help users determine what kind of issue Windows is having with a piece of hardware.

Driverquery command

The driverquery command-line program generates lists of installed devices and drivers, similar to the Device Manager's output, which the user may view on-screen or redirect to a file. This is useful for note-taking and for reporting problems to remote third parties such as technical support personnel. The program has switches to control the output detail and format, including an /fo switch with csv parameter to generate output in comma-separated values format, suitable for importing into a spreadsheet application such as Microsoft Excel.

See also
 Device driver
 Microsoft Management Console
 Troubleshooting
 systeminfo

References

External links

driverquery | Microsoft Docs
The DevCon utility

Windows components